Saint-Gilles-de-la-Neuville is a commune in the Seine-Maritime department in the Normandy region in northern France.

Geography
The A29 autoroute passes through the south of the commune.

Population

Places of interest
 A church dating from the twelfth century.

See also
Communes of the Seine-Maritime department

References

Communes of Seine-Maritime